James Job Holland (1841 – 31 August 1922) was a Liberal Party Member of Parliament in Auckland, New Zealand, and the mayor of Auckland from 1893 to 1896.

Biography

Early life
Born in Leicester, England, Holland emigrated to New Zealand in 1860, settling in Auckland in 1864 after spending time in the Otago gold fields and serving as a sergeant with the Militia in the Waikato during the New Zealand Wars. He established a building and contracting business, and was prominent in many civic and charitable bodies in Auckland. He was a member of Manchester Unity, an Oddfellow and a Freemason. In 1864, Holland married Agnes Melvin MacKenzie, daughter of Duncan MacKenzie, of Glasgow, and the couple went on to have three daughters and three sons.

Political career

In 1886, Holland was elected as city councillor for the city's Eastern Ward. He also served two terms on the Auckland Harbour Board and was for some years a member of the Hospital Board. Later, in 1893 he was elected Mayor of Auckland City serving for three years.

He was also defeated in a 1900 by-election after the death of the sitting member William Crowther by Joseph Witheford, despite being endorsed by Seddon.

Upon defeat, Holland was subsequently appointed as a Government trustee to the Auckland Savings Bank. He also served as the chairman of the committee of St. John Ambulance Association.

Death
Holland died at his home in Auckland on 31 August 1922, and was buried at Purewa Cemetery.

Notes

References

1841 births
1922 deaths
New Zealand Liberal Party MPs
Unsuccessful candidates in the 1899 New Zealand general election
Mayors of Auckland
Auckland City Councillors
People from Leicester
English emigrants to New Zealand
Members of the New Zealand House of Representatives
New Zealand MPs for Auckland electorates
New Zealand Freemasons
Burials at Purewa Cemetery
19th-century New Zealand politicians
Auckland Harbour Board members